Josh Edmondson is an American songwriter and record producer based in Los Angeles, California. He contributed songs to the 2016 Grammy nominated album Falling into Place by Rebelution   's and G Loves 2021 Best Contemporary Blues nominated album The Juice. He co-produced the Emmy nominated song I Heard Your Voice in a Dream for NBC's Smash (American TV series). and has also written and produced RIAA certified songs for Disney's chart-topping Descendants Franchise that includes a No. 1 on Billboard 200
Other credits include Train (band), Mike Love of The Beach Boys, G. Love & Special Sauce, Goo Goo Dolls, Zendaya, and The O'Jays Most recenlty, Josh is writing/producing all original songs for NBC's new drama Ordinary Joe starring James Wolk.

Producing credits 

2022 "Fly Me to the Moon" - Super Bowl LVI - (eToro Ad)
2022 Jordin Sparks "New Star in the Sky" Rugrats (2021 TV series) 
2021 NBC's Ordinary Joe – Season 1 
2021 Christmas Again (Disney Channel Original Movie)2021 Holiday Energy - A Loud House Christmas Nickelodeon 
2020 LOL Surprise REMIX - Magic Star / Sony
2019 Soundtrack – Season 1 Soundtrack 
2019 Mike Love - 12 Sides of Summer
2018 Mike Love - Reason for the Season
2017 Descendants 2 - Original Movie Soundtrack Walt Disney Records
2015 Descendants – Original Movie Soundtrack Walt Disney Records
2015 firekid – Firekid Atlantic Records
2015 Liv & Maddie – Original TV Soundtrack Walt Disney Records
2015 Hunter Hunted – Ready For You RCA
2015 Teen Beach 2 – Original Movie Soundtrack Walt Disney Records
2015 Band Of Merrymakers – Welcome To Our Christmas Party Sony Masterworks
2013 Smash - Season 2 Soundtrack
2013 Hollywood Undead – Notes From The Underground Interscope Records
2013 The Mowgli's – Waiting for the Dawn Island Records
2012 Train – California 27 – Sony Music

Engineering credits 
2019 The Ojays – Start Stopping' S-Curve Records
2019 Mike Love – 12 Sides of Summer
2019 Goo Goo Dolls – Miracle Pill Warner Music
2018 Mike Love – Reason for the Season
2013 Oh Land – Wishbone Federal Prism Records
2012 Blues Traveler – Suzie Cracks The Whip Concord Records
2011 Nikki Jean – Pennies in a Jar S-Curve Records
2008 Charlotte Sometimes – Waves and the Both Of Us Geffen Records

Songwriting credits

In films

In television

Recorded by artists

References

Musicians from Cincinnati
Living people
Songwriters from Ohio
Record producers from Los Angeles
Year of birth missing (living people)